Mark Curp (born January 5, 1959, in Chillicothe, Missouri) held the world record for the half marathon from 1985 until 1990. He continued holding the American record in the half marathon until a new record was set by Ryan Hall in 2007.

Curp attended Central Missouri State University, receiving a bachelor's degree in 1981 and a master's degree in 1982.

Curp broke the men's world record in the half marathon on September 15, 1985, clocking 1:00:55 at the Philadelphia Distance Run in Philadelphia, Pennsylvania, at an overall pace just under 4:39 per mile for the official 13.1094-mile distance. According to the Missouri Sports Hall of Fame, "in 1987 and 1988, Runner’s World magazine ranked him the number one road racer in the world." (Curp's best time in a marathon came at the 1987 Twin Cities Marathon, when he finished third with a time of 2:11:45.)

Curp's world record in the half marathon stood for five years, until September 16, 1990, when Dionicio Ceron broke Curp's time by nine seconds on the same Philadelphia course.

Curp's time of 1:00:55 stood as the American record until January 14, 2007, when Ryan Hall broke the record at the Aramco Houston Half-Marathon in Houston, Texas.

Achievements
All results regarding marathon, unless stated otherwise

References

 Interview

1959 births
Living people
People from Lee's Summit, Missouri
American male long-distance runners
University of Central Missouri alumni
20th-century American people